Dwight is a village in north Belchertown, Massachusetts, United States. It was a thriving railroad destination and farming community in the 19th century with lumber mills, two schools, two railroad stations, restaurants, ballrooms, an inn, a general store, post office, and world-renowned flower gardens. Today it is known for its natural beauty, scenic waterfalls, forests, ponds, brooks and hiking trails. It was named for the Dwight family.

Geography 
The center of Dwight is in the northwestern region of Belchertown, and located at 42°19'40.0"N 72°26'53.8"W (42.327778, -72.448278). Its boundaries have historically spanned approximately nine square miles and border Pelham on the north, Amherst on the west, the Lakes on the south and Route 202 on the east. 

The center of the village, defined as the intersection of Federal and Goodell Streets, lies 4.8 miles northwest from Belchertown Common (by State Route 9); 4.2 miles southwest from West Pelham; 3.5 miles east from the South Amherst Common; and 4.2 miles southeast from East Amherst Common. 

The village developed around the intersection of three named brooks: Montague Brook, Scarborough Brook, Hop Brook. It also encompasses Scarborough Pond, Knight’s Pond and Jabish Brook, many unnamed tributaries and hundreds of acres of conservation land including Holland Glen, Wentworth Property, Topping Farm, Scarborough Brook, Upper Gulf, Mead's Corner, Reed Property and part of Jabish Brook.

The area is immediate north of Holland Pond, Lake Arcadia and Lake Metacomet, known previously as the Bridgman Ponds, or the Pond Hill area, the site of early colonial settlement (1732) near the Old Bay Road that ran from Boston to Albany as well as the birthplace of Elijah Coleman Bridgeman. The Lake Vale Cemetery was established here in the 1750s.

The Norwottuck Branch Rail Trail, part of the Mass Central Rail Trail, begins at Dwight village, near Warren Wright Road, north of Wilson Road. It's an 11-mile (18 km) combination bicycle/pedestrian paved rail trail running from Northampton, Massachusetts, through Hadley and Amherst, to Belchertown, Massachusetts. 

The Metacomet-Monadnock Trail, part of the 215-mile New England National Scenic Trail, crosses through the heart of Dwight on Federal Street and up Gulf Road. The Robert Frost Trail transverses Dwight, following Warren Wright Road across Hop Brook.

History 
Belchertown is said to be part of a crossroads of Native trails in the Connecticut River Valley in Western Massachusetts that indigenous people traveled including the Nipmuc and Norwottuck, or Nonotuck and Nolwotogg, among others. Artifacts found in the early 20th century just south of Dwight, near Lake Metacomet, suggest, "evidence of Native American occupations in Belchertown," that began some 7,000 years ago.

The first white landowner at the village was Capt. Nathaniel Dwight (1712-1784), who was deeded one square mile in 1734. The first structure, a log home, was erected about 1765. The first colonial settlers were said to be Justus Dwight (1739-1824) and Sarah Lamb (1737-1832) and their children in Fall 1769. 

A cemetery was established here about 1785. Several homes dating from 1770 to 1800 are still standing.

References 

Belchertown, Massachusetts

Villages in Hampshire County, Massachusetts